Frederick Clifton Grant (February 2, 1891 – July 11, 1974) was an American New Testament scholar. Grant was born on February 2, 1891, in Beloit, Wisconsin. He received a Bachelor of Divinity degree from General Theological Seminary in 1912 and Master of Sacred Theology and Doctor of Theology degrees from Western Theological Seminary in 1916 and 1922 respectively. Grant was Edward Robertson Professor of Biblical Theology at the Union Theological Seminary in New York City. In 1951, a Festschrift was published in his honor. The Joy of Study: Papers on New Testament and Related Subjects Presented to Honor Frederick Clifton Grant included contributions from Henry Cadbury, Philip Carrington, and Robert M. Grant.

Grant argued for a form of the multi-source hypothesis in relation to the synoptic problem. He argued in his 1957 work, The Gospels, Their Origin and Their Growth, that Matthew, Mark, and Luke all draw from the same collection of myths, legends, miracle tales, paradigms, and apothegms.

Grant's view that the author of the Gospel of John was "part of a group of early Christian gnostic-mystics" has since been discredited.

Grant died on July 11, 1974.

Selected works

Books

Festschrift

References

Footnotes

Bibliography

External links
 

1891 births
1974 deaths
20th-century American Episcopal priests
20th-century Anglican theologians
American biblical scholars
American Episcopal theologians
Anglican biblical scholars
New Testament scholars
People from Beloit, Wisconsin
Union Theological Seminary (New York City) faculty